This is a list of all captains of the North Melbourne Football Club, an Australian rules football club in the Australian Football League.

References

North Melbourne Football Club Honour Roll

Captains
North Melbourne
Melbourne sport-related lists